South Carolina Highway 111 (SC 111) was a state highway that existed in the west-central part of Lexington County. It was partially in the city limits of the town of Gilbert.

Route description
SC 111 began at an intersection with SC 113 (now Main Street) in Gilbert. It traveled to the west into Summit, where it curved to the west-northwest. It headed to the north-northwest and intersected U.S. Route 1 (US 1). It curved to the north-northeast and then back to the north-northwest until it met its northern terminus, an intersection with SC 386 (now Ridge Road) in Ridge Crossroads.

History
SC 111 was established in 1940. It was decommissioned in 1947. It was downgraded to secondary roads. Today, it is known as Hampton Street from its southern terminus to US 1 and then Old Field Road and Cedar Grove Road from there to Ridge Crossroads.

Major intersections

See also

References

External links
Former SC 111 at the Virginia Highways South Carolina Annex

111
Transportation in Lexington County, South Carolina